Gifan-e Pain (also Romanized as Gīfān-e Pā’īn; also known as Pā’īndeh) is a village in Gifan Rural District, Garmkhan District, Bojnord County, North Khorasan Province, Iran. At the 2006 census, its population was 286, in 69 families.

References 

Populated places in Bojnord County